Elections to Bury Metropolitan Borough Council were held on 3 May 2007.  One third of the council was up for election, and the council remained in No Overall Control, with the Conservative Party overtaking the Labour Party as the largest group.

After the election, the composition of the council was:
Conservative 23
Labour 20
Liberal Democrat 8

Election result

Ward results

References

2007 English local elections
2007
2000s in Greater Manchester